Andy Upton is an Australian singer-songwriter from Adelaide, South Australia. In 1976 and 1977, Upton released three singles, all of which peaked within the top 100 on the Australian Kent Music Report. Upton wrote and was the original singer of Here's Humphrey theme.

Upton later began working for 5KA as a jingle writer during the 1980s.

He returned to performing in 2000 after some years away from the music scene, performing in and around Australia.  He performed with the Adelaide-based band The Boys, as their frontman, during a December 2018 event, Jim Slade's Baby Boomers Rock Adelaide.

Discography

Singles

References

Year of birth missing (living people)
Living people
20th-century Australian musicians
Musicians from Adelaide